Glenville District No. 5 Schoolhouse, also known as Green Corners School, is a historic one-room school building located at Glenville, Schenectady County, New York. It was built about 1825, and is a small one-story, rectangular brick building.  It measures approximately 24 feet by 20 feet.  It rests on a stone foundation and is surmounted by a gable roof with overhanging eaves. It functioned as a public school for first through eighth grades until it closed in 1946.  The building was restored in 1976.

It was added to the National Register of Historic Places in 2011.

References

One-room schoolhouses in New York (state)
School buildings on the National Register of Historic Places in New York (state)
School buildings completed in 1825
Schools in Schenectady County, New York
National Register of Historic Places in Schenectady County, New York